The 2008–09 Denver Nuggets season was the 42nd season of the franchise, 33rd in the National Basketball Association (NBA). They finished the regular season with 54 wins and 28 losses, the franchise's best record since 1987–88. In the playoffs, the Nuggets defeated New Orleans Hornets in five games in the first round; this series included a notable 58-point bludgeoning of the Hornets in Game 4. The Nuggets then defeated the Dallas Mavericks in five games in the Western Conference Semi-finals to reach the Conference Finals for the first time since 1985, ending their streak of five straight first-round exits. However, the Nuggets lost to the eventual NBA champion Los Angeles Lakers, ending their playoff run. This was the second straight year the Nuggets had their season ended by the Lakers.

As of May 2021 the Nuggets' six-game loss to the Lakers in the 2009 Western Conference Finals was tied closest the team has ever come to reaching the NBA Finals, after they made it to the Conference Finals in 2020, but were once again beaten by the Lakers (who again won the championship), this time in five games.

Key dates
 June 26: The 2008 NBA draft took place in New York City.
 July 1: The free agency period started.
During the first week of the season, superstar guard Allen Iverson was traded in a blockbuster deal to the Detroit Pistons for Chauncey Billups, Antonio McDyess and Cheikh Samb. McDyess was released soon after the trade.

Draft picks

The Denver Nuggets had no draft picks in the 2008 NBA draft, but did acquire the draft rights of Sonny Weems from the Chicago Bulls. Weems was the 39th pick of the draft.

Roster

Regular season

Standings

Game log

|- style="background:#fcc;"
| 1
| October 29
| @ Utah
| 
| Allen Iverson, Kenyon Martin (18)
| Kenyon Martin, Chris Andersen (6)
| Allen Iverson (8)
| EnergySolutions Arena19,111
| 0–1
|- style="background:#bfb;"
| 2
| October 31
| @ L.A. Clippers
| 
| Allen Iverson (25)
| Kenyon Martin (13)
| Anthony Carter (6)
| Staples Center11,418
| 1–1

|- style="background:#fcc;"
| 3
| November 1
| L.A. Lakers
| 
| Anthony Carter (20)
| Chris Andersen (7)
| Allen Iverson (7)
| Pepsi Center19,651
| 1–2
|- style="background:#fcc;"
| 4
| November 5
| @ Golden State
| 
| Carmelo Anthony (28)
| Nenê (15)
| Anthony Carter (11)
| Oracle Arena18,194
| 1–3
|- style="background:#bfb;"
| 5
| November 7
| Dallas
| 
| Carmelo Anthony (28)
| Carmelo Anthony (8)
| Anthony Carter (7)
| Pepsi Center19,175
| 2–3
|- style="background:#bfb;"
| 6
| November 9
| Memphis
| 
| Carmelo Anthony (24)
| Nenê (12)
| Chauncey Billups (10)
| Pepsi Center14,359
| 3–3
|- style="background:#bfb;"
| 7
| November 11
| @ Charlotte
| 
| Carmelo Anthony (25)
| Nenê, Linas Kleiza (8)
| Anthony Carter (6)
| Time Warner Cable Arena10,753
| 4–3
|- style="background:#fcc;"
| 8
| November 13
| @ Cleveland
| 
| Chauncey Billups (26)
| Kenyon Martin (10)
| Chauncey Billups (6)
| Quicken Loans Arena20,562
| 4–4
|- style="background:#bfb;"
| 9
| November 14
| @ Boston
| 
| Chauncey Billups, Carmelo Anthony (18)
| Carmelo Anthony (13)
| Chauncey Billups (7)
| TD Banknorth Garden18,624
| 5–4
|- style="background:#bfb;"
| 10
| November 16
| Minnesota
| 
| Chauncey Billups (26)
| Carmelo Anthony (12)
| Chauncey Billups (5)
| Pepsi Center16,721
| 6–4
|- style="background:#bfb;"
| 11
| November 18
| Milwaukee
| 
| Linas Kleiza (25)
| Nenê (6)
| Chauncey Billups (5)
| Pepsi Center14,413
| 7–4
|- style="background:#bfb;"
| 12
| November 19
| @ San Antonio
| 
| Chauncey Billups (22)
| Carmelo Anthony, Nenê (9)
| Carmelo Anthony (7)
| AT&T Center16,559
| 8–4
|- style="background:#fcc;"
| 13
| November 21
| @ L.A. Lakers
| 
| J. R. Smith, Nenê (18)
| Carmelo Anthony (10)
| Chauncey Billups (9)
| Staples Center18,997
| 8–5
|- style="background:#bfb;"
| 14
| November 23
| Chicago
| 
| Kenyon Martin (26)
| Carmelo Anthony (13)
| Chauncey Billups, Carmelo Anthony (8)
| Pepsi Center16,202
| 9–5
|- style="background:#bfb;"
| 15
| November 26
| @ L.A. Clippers
| 
| Carmelo Anthony (30)
| Carmelo Anthony (11)
| Chauncey Billups (11)
| Staples Center14,934
| 10–5
|- style="background:#fcc;"
| 16
| November 27
| New Orleans
| 
| J. R. Smith (32)
| Chris Andersen (8)
| Anthony Carter (8)
| Pepsi Center15,563
| 10–6
|- style="background:#bfb;"
| 17
| November 29
| @ Minnesota
| 
| Chauncey Billups (27)
| Carmelo Anthony (10)
| Chucky Atkins (5)
| Target Center14,197
| 11–6
|- style="background:#bfb;"
| 18
| November 30
| Houston
| 
| Chauncey Billups (28)
| Nenê (10)
| Chauncey Billups (10)
| Pepsi Center17,201
| 12–6

|- style="background:#bfb;"
| 19
| December 2
| Toronto
| 
| Chauncey Billups (24)
| Nenê (11)
| Chauncey Billups (14)
| Pepsi Center14,243
| 13–6
|- style="background:#fcc;"
| 20
| December 4
| San Antonio
| 
| Carmelo Anthony (16)
| J. R. Smith (10)
| J. R. Smith, Chauncey Billups (4)
| Pepsi Center15,866
| 13–7
|- style="background:#bfb;"
| 21
| December 6
| @ Sacramento
| 
| Chauncey Billups (24)
| Nenê, Carmelo Anthony (7)
| Chauncey Billups (4)
| ARCO Arena12,322
| 14–7
|- style="background:#bfb;"
| 22
| December 10
| Minnesota
| 
| Carmelo Anthony (45)
| Carmelo Anthony (11)
| Chauncey Billups (6)
| Pepsi Center14,007
| 15–7
|- style="background:#bfb;"
| 23
| December 13
| Golden State
| 
| Carmelo Anthony (27)
| Carmelo Anthony (9)
| Chauncey Billups (11)
| Pepsi Center15,322
| 16–7
|- style="background:#bfb;"
| 24
| December 15
| @ Dallas
| 
| J. R. Smith (25)
| Kenyon Martin (10)
| Chauncey Billups (8)
| American Airlines Center19,969
| 17–7
|- style="background:#fcc;"
| 25
| December 16
| @ Houston
| 
| Carmelo Anthony (22)
| Kenyon Martin (8)
| Chauncey Billups (6)
| Toyota Center17,737
| 17–8
|- style="background:#fcc;"
| 26
| December 19
| Cleveland
| 
| Chauncey Billups (16)
| Chris Andersen (10)
| Anthony Carter, J. R. Smith (4)
| Pepsi Center19,155
| 17–9
|- style="background:#fcc;"
| 27
| December 20
| @ Phoenix
| 
| J. R. Smith (23)
| Nenê (15)
| Chauncey Billups (8)
| US Airways Center18,422
| 17–10
|- style="background:#bfb;"
| 28
| December 22
| Portland
| 
| Chauncey Billups, Nenê (19)
| Kenyon Martin (12)
| Chauncey Billups (10)
| Pepsi Center18,611
| 18–10
|- style="background:#fcc;"
| 29
| December 23
| @ Portland
| 
| Linas Kleiza (20)
| Nenê (13)
| Chucky Atkins (4)
| Rose Garden20,007
| 18–11
|- style="background:#bfb;"
| 30
| December 26
| Philadelphia
| 
| J. R. Smith (27)
| Nenê (12)
| Chauncey Billups (10)
| Pepsi Center19,155
| 19–11
|- style="background:#bfb;"
| 31
| December 28
| @ New York
| 
| Carmelo Anthony (32)
| Carmelo Anthony, Nenê (9)
| Chauncey Billups (5)
| Madison Square Garden19,763
| 20–11
|- style="background:#fcc;"
| 32
| December 29
| @ Atlanta
| 
| Kenyon Martin (19)
| Chris Andersen (6)
| Anthony Carter (7)
| Philips Arena17,131
| 20–12
|- style="background:#bfb;"
| 33
| December 31
| @ Toronto
| 
| Nenê (21)
| Chris Andersen (10)
| Chauncey Billups (7)
| Air Canada Centre18,879
| 21–12

|- style="background:#bfb;"
| 34
| January 2
| @ Oklahoma City
| 
| Carmelo Anthony (31)
| Nenê (14)
| Chauncey Billups, Anthony Carter (7)
| Ford Center18,613
| 22–12
|- style="background:#bfb;"
| 35
| January 3
| New Orleans
| 
| Carmelo Anthony (22)
| Carmelo Anthony (7)
| Chauncey Billups (6)
| Pepsi Center19,614
| 23–12
|- style="background:#bfb;"
| 36
| January 5
| Indiana
| 
| Kenyon Martin (25)
| Chris Andersen (9)
| Chauncey Billups (11)
| Pepsi Center14,255
| 24–12
|- style="background:#bfb;"
| 37
| January 7
| Miami
| 
| Chauncey Billups, J. R. Smith, Linas Kleiza (21)
| Kenyon Martin (8)
| Anthony Carter (9)
| Pepsi Center15,459
| 25–12
|- style="background:#fcc;"
| 38
| January 9
| Detroit
| 
| Chauncey Billups (30)
| Nenê (9)
| Chauncey Billups, J. R. Smith (4)
| Pepsi Center19,682
| 25–13
|- style="background:#bfb;"
| 39
| January 13
| Dallas
| 
| Chauncey Billups (23)
| Chris Andersen (10)
| J. R. Smith (7)
| Pepsi Center14,158
| 26–13
|- style="background:#bfb;"
| 40
| January 15
| Phoenix
| 
| Chauncey Billups (26)
| Nenê (14)
| Chauncey Billups (8)
| Pepsi Center18,073
| 27–13
|- style="background:#fcc;"
| 41
| January 17
| Orlando
| 
| Linas Kleiza (26)
| Chris Andersen (9)
| Anthony Carter (7)
| Pepsi Center19,749
| 27–14
|- style="background:#fcc;"
| 42
| January 19
| @ Houston
| 
| J. R. Smith (24)
| Nenê (12)
| Chauncey Billups (12)
| Toyota Center18,199
| 27–15
|- style="background:#bfb;"
| 43
| January 20
| Sacramento
| 
| Linas Kleiza (27)
| Nenê (12)
| Anthony Carter (10)
| Pepsi Center15,164
| 28–15
|- style="background:#bfb;"
| 44
| January 25
| Utah
| 
| Nenê (28)
| Linas Kleiza, Nenê (9)
| Anthony Carter (10)
| Pepsi Center17,895
| 29–15
|- style="background:#bfb;"
| 45
| January 27
| @ Memphis
| 
| Chauncey Billups (29)
| Kenyon Martin (10)
| Kenyon Martin (4)
| FedExForum11,338
| 30–15
|- style="background:#fcc;"
| 46
| January 28
| @ New Orleans
| 
| Kenyon Martin (22)
| Linas Kleiza, Kenyon Martin, J. R. Smith, Nenê (6)
| Anthony Carter (6)
| New Orleans Arena15,792
| 30–16
|- style="background:#bfb;"
| 47
| January 30
| Charlotte
| 
| Nenê (22)
| Nenê (12)
| Anthony Carter, Chauncey Billups (6)
| Pepsi Center18,463
| 31–16

|- style="background:#bfb;"
| 48
| February 3
| San Antonio
| 
| Carmelo Anthony (35)
| Nenê (11)
| Anthony Carter (9)
| Pepsi Center18,536
| 32–16
|- style="background:#bfb;"
| 49
| February 4
| @ Oklahoma City
| 
| Carmelo Anthony (32)
| Nenê (8)
| Carmelo Anthony (11)
| Ford Center18,332
| 33–16
|- style="background:#bfb;"
| 50
| February 6
| @ Washington
| 
| Carmelo Anthony (23)
| Nenê (10)
| Anthony Carter (7)
| Verizon Center20,173
| 34–16
|- style="background:#fcc;"
| 51
| February 7
| @ New Jersey
| 
| Carmelo Anthony (15)
| Nenê (7)
| Chauncey Billups (3)
| Izod Center17,697
| 34–17
|- style="background:#bfb;"
| 52
| February 10
| @ Miami
| 
| Chauncey Billups (23)
| Kenyon Martin (10)
| Anthony Carter, Chauncey Billups (5)
| American Airlines Arena16,784
| 35–17
|- style="background:#bfb;"
| 53
| February 11
| @ Orlando
| 
| Carmelo Anthony (29)
| Carmelo Anthony (8)
| Chauncey Billups (4)
| Amway Arena17,461
| 36–17
|- style="background:#bfb;"
| 54
| February 18
| @ Philadelphia
| 
| Carmelo Anthony (26)
| Carmelo Anthony (14)
| Anthony Carter, Chauncey Billups, J. R. Smith (5)
| Wachovia Center15,979
| 37–17
|- style="background:#fcc;"
| 55
| February 20
| @ Chicago
| 
| Chauncey Billups (25)
| Carmelo Anthony (8)
| Chauncey Billups (6)
| United Center21,970
| 37–18
|- style="background:#fcc;"
| 56
| February 22
| @ Milwaukee
| 
| Carmelo Anthony (33)
| Carmelo Anthony (9)
| J. R. Smith (5)
| Bradley Center14,891
| 37–19
|- style="background:#fcc;"
| 57
| February 23
| Boston
| 
| J. R. Smith (19)
| Johan Petro (10)
| J. R. Smith, Chauncey Billups (5)
| Pepsi Center19,784
| 37–20
|- style="background:#bfb;"
| 58
| February 25
| Atlanta
| 
| Chauncey Billups (33)
| Chris Andersen (12)
| Chauncey Billups (7)
| Pepsi Center18,418
| 38–20
|- style="background:#bfb;"
| 59
| February 27
| L.A. Lakers
| 
| Chauncey Billups, J. R. Smith (22)
| Carmelo Anthony, Chris Andersen (12)
| Chauncey Billups (6)
| Pepsi Center19,920
| 39–20

|- style="background:#fcc;"
| 60
| March 1
| @ Indiana
| 
| Chauncey Billups (27)
| Chris Andersen (12)
| Chauncey Billups (7)
| Conseco Fieldhouse12,458
| 39–21
|- style="background:#fcc;"
| 61
| March 3
| @ Detroit
| 
| Chauncey Billups (34)
| Nenê, Renaldo Balkman, Chris Andersen (7)
| Chauncey Billups, Kenyon Martin (4)
| The Palace of Auburn Hills22,076
| 39–22
|- style="background:#bfb;"
| 62
| March 5
| Portland
| 
| Carmelo Anthony (38)
| J. R. Smith (7)
| Chauncey Billups (9)
| Pepsi Center16,801
| 40–22
|- style="background:#fcc;"
| 63
| March 6
| @ Utah
| 
| J. R. Smith (27)
| Renaldo Balkman (14)
| J. R. Smith (5)
| EnergySolutions Arena19,911
| 40–23
|- style="background:#fcc;"
| 64
| March 8
| @ Sacramento
| 
| Carmelo Anthony (32)
| Renaldo Balkman (10)
| Chauncey Billups (8)
| ARCO Arena12,678
| 40–24
|- style="background:#fcc;"
| 65
| March 9
| Houston
| 
| Chauncey Billups (28)
| Nenê (8)
| Chauncey Billups (5)
| Pepsi Center16,020
| 40–25
|- style="background:#bfb;"
| 66
| March 11
| Oklahoma City
| 
| Carmelo Anthony (22)
| Renaldo Balkman (14)
| Anthony Carter (12)
| Pepsi Center16,186
| 41–25
|- style="background:#bfb;"
| 67
| March 14
| L.A. Clippers
| 
| Renaldo Balkman (22)
| Chris Andersen, Renaldo Balkman (11)
| Chauncey Billups (9)
| Pepsi Center18,676
| 42–25
|- style="background:#bfb;"
| 68
| March 16
| New Jersey
| 
| J. R. Smith, Nenê (19)
| Chris Andersen (9)
| Chauncey Billups (10)
| Pepsi Center16,223
| 43–25
|- style="background:#bfb;"
| 69
| March 18
| @ Memphis
| 
| Carmelo Anthony (35)
| Renaldo Balkman (12)
| Chauncey Billups (12)
| FedExForum11,087
| 44–25
|- style="background:#bfb;"
| 70
| March 20
| Washington
| 
| J. R. Smith (40)
| Chris Andersen (11)
| Anthony Carter (10)
| Pepsi Center18,231
| 45–25
|- style="background:#fcc;"
| 71
| March 23
| @ Phoenix
| 
| Carmelo Anthony (29)
| Kenyon Martin (9)
| Chauncey Billups (8)
| US Airways Center18,422
| 45–26
|- style="background:#bfb;"
| 72
| March 25
| @ New Orleans
| 
| Carmelo Anthony (29)
| Chris Andersen (9)
| Chauncey Billups (6)
| New Orleans Arena17,274
| 46–26
|- style="background:#bfb;"
| 73
| March 27
| @ Dallas
| 
| Carmelo Anthony (43)
| Carmelo Anthony (11)
| Chauncey Billups (9)
| American Airlines Center20,310
| 47–26
|- style="background:#bfb;"
| 74
| March 28
| Golden State
| 
| Carmelo Anthony (31)
| Chris Andersen (11)
| Anthony Carter (13)
| Pepsi Center19,155
| 48–26
|- style="background:#bfb;"
| 75
| March 31
| New York
| 
| Carmelo Anthony (29)
| Nenê (12)
| Anthony Carter (8)
| Pepsi Center17,851
| 49–26

|- style="background:#bfb;"
| 76
| April 2
| Utah
| 
| J. R. Smith (28)
| Chris Andersen (10)
| J. R. Smith (7)
| Pepsi Center17,969
| 50–26
|- style="background:#bfb;"
| 77
| April 4
| L.A. Clippers
| 
| J. R. Smith (34)
| Chris Andersen (8)
| Chauncey Billups (9)
| Pepsi Center17,880
| 51–26
|- style="background:#bfb;"
| 78
| April 5
| @ Minnesota
| 
| Carmelo Anthony (23)
| Carmelo Anthony, Chris Andersen (8)
| Chauncey Billups (7)
| Target Center16,839
| 52–26
|- style="background:#bfb;"
| 79
| April 8
| Oklahoma City
| 
| Carmelo Anthony (31)
| Nenê (10)
| Chauncey Billups (9)
| Pepsi Center16,536
| 53–26
|- style="background:#fcc;"
| 80
| April 9
| @ L.A. Lakers
| 
| Carmelo Anthony (23)
| Nenê (10)
| Chauncey Billups (8)
| Staples Center18,997
| 53–27
|- style="background:#bfb;"
| 81
| April 13
| Sacramento
| 
| J. R. Smith (45)
| Chris Andersen (10)
| Carmelo Anthony (9)
| Pepsi Center15,823
| 54–27
|- style="background:#fcc;"
| 82
| April 15
| @ Portland
| 
| Chauncey Billups (13)
| Nenê (9)
| Chauncey Billups (4)
| Rose Garden20,652
| 54-28

Playoffs

Game log

|- style="background:#bfb;"
| 1
| April 19
| New Orleans
| 
| Billups (36)
| Nenê (14)
| Billups (8)
| Pepsi Center19,536
| 1–0
|- style="background:#bfb;"
| 2
| April 22
| New Orleans
| 
| Billups (31)
| Nenê (8)
| Anthony (9)
| Pepsi Center19,623
| 2–0
|- style="background:#fcc;"
| 3
| April 25
| @ New Orleans
| 
| Anthony (25)
| Martin (10)
| Billups (6)
| New Orleans Arena17,489
| 2–1
|- style="background:#bfb;"
| 4
| April 27
| @ New Orleans
| 
| Anthony (26)
| Andersen (8)
| Billups (8)
| New Orleans Arena17,236
| 3–1
|- style="background:#bfb;"
| 5
| April 29
| New Orleans
| 
| Anthony (34)
| Andersen, Martin, Nenê (7)
| Billups (11)
| Pepsi Center19,744
| 4–1

|- style="background:#bfb;"
| 1
| May 3
| Dallas
| 
| Nenê (24)
| Andersen (6)
| Billups, Smith (6)
| Pepsi Center19,631
| 1–0
|- style="background:#bfb;"
| 2
| May 5
| Dallas
| 
| Anthony, Nenê (25)
| Andersen (9)
| Billups (8)
| Pepsi Center19,890
| 2–0
|- style="background:#bfb;"
| 3
| May 9
| @ Dallas
| 
| Billups (32)
| Anthony, Nenê (8)
| Nenê (4)
| American Airlines Center20,620
| 3–0
|- style="background:#fcc;"
| 4
| May 11
| @ Dallas
| 
| Anthony (41)
| Anthony (11)
| Billups (7)
| American Airlines Center20,523
| 3–1
|- style="background:#bfb;"
| 5
| May 13
| Dallas
| 
| Anthony (30)
| Billups, Nenê (7)
| Billups (12)
| Pepsi Center19,962
| 4–1

|- style="background:#fcc;"
| 1
| May 19
| @ LA Lakers
| 
| Anthony (39)
| Martin (8)
| Billups (8)
| Staples Center18,997
| 0–1
|- style="background:#bfb;"
| 2
| May 21
| @ LA Lakers
| 
| Anthony (34)
| Anthony, Nenê (9)
| Nenê (6)
| Staples Center18,997
| 1–1
|- style="background:#fcc;"
| 3
| May 23
| LA Lakers
| 
| Anthony (21)
| Andersen, Martin (7)
| Billups (7)
| Pepsi Center19,939
| 1–2
|- style="background:#bfb;"
| 4
| May 25
| LA Lakers
| 
| Billups, Smith (24)
| Martin (15)
| Nenê (6)
| Pepsi Center20,037
| 2–2
|- style="background:#fcc;"
| 5
| May 27
| @ LA Lakers
| 
| Anthony (31)
| Andersen, Nenê (8)
| Billups (5)
| Staples Center18,997
| 2–3
|- style="background:#fcc;"
| 6
| May 29
| LA Lakers
| 
| Anthony (25)
| Nenê (6)
| Billups (9)
| Pepsi Center20,053
| 2–4

Player statistics

Season

Playoffs

Awards and records

Awards

Records

Transactions

Trades

Free agents

Additions

Subtractions

References

Denver Nuggets seasons
Denver
Denver Nuggets
Denver Nuggets